Roamin' Holiday is a 1937 Our Gang short comedy film directed by Gordon Douglas. It was the 155th Our Gang short released (156th episode, 67th talking short, and 68th talking episode).

Plot
Upset at being forced to do the household chores all weekend long (and the threat of taking dancing lessons), Spanky, Alfalfa, Buckwheat, and Porky decide to run away from home. Taking a breather in the tiny village of Jenksville, the boys manage to cadge a meal from kindly storekeeper Mrs. Jenks. But when she finds out that the kids are runaways, she passes this information along to her husband, Constable Hi Jenks, who jovially decides to teach the boys a lesson. Pretending to arrest the four youngsters, Constable Jenks dresses them in convict stripes and forces them to work on the rock pile, figuring that after an hour or so they will be glad to return home. But an unanticipated swarm of bees brings this little morality play to a sudden and painful conclusion for the four roamin' rascals.

Cast

The Gang
 Eugene Lee as Porky
 George McFarland as Spanky
 Carl Switzer as Alfalfa
 Billie Thomas as Buckwheat
 Darla Hood as Darla
 Pete the Pup as himself

Additional cast
 Joe White as One of Alfalfa's twin brothers
 Tom White as One of Alfalfa's twin brothers
 Otis Harlan as Hiram Jenks
 May Wallace as 'Ma' Jenks

See also
 Our Gang filmography

References

External links

1937 films
1937 comedy films
American black-and-white films
Films directed by Gordon Douglas
Hal Roach Studios short films
Our Gang films
American comedy short films
1930s American films